In baseball and softball, an uncaught third strike (sometimes referred to as dropped third strike or non-caught third strike) occurs when the catcher fails to cleanly catch a pitch for the third strike of a plate appearance. In Major League Baseball (MLB), the specific rules concerning the uncaught third strike are addressed in Rules 5.05 and 5.09 of the Official Baseball Rules: This is one of the oldest rules in modern baseball, dating at least to the Knickerbocker Rules of 1845: "Three balls being struck at and missed and the last one caught, is a hand-out."

On an uncaught third strike with (1) no runner on first base, or (2) with a runner on first base and two outs, the batter immediately becomes a runner. The strike is called, but the umpire does not call the batter out. The umpire may also signal that there is "no catch" of the pitch. The batter may then attempt to reach first base and must be tagged or forced out. With two outs and the bases loaded, the catcher who fails to catch the third strike may, upon picking up the ball, step on home plate for a force-out or make a throw to any other base in an effort to force out a runner. An "uncaught" strike includes not only pitches dropped by the catcher, but also pitches that hit the ground before the catcher attempts to catch it.

The purpose of the "no runner on first base or two outs" qualification is to prevent the catcher from deliberately dropping a third-strike pitch and then initiating an unfair double or triple play with possible force plays at second base, third base, or home plate, in addition to putting the batter out at first base. The logic of the situation is similar to that which led to the infield fly rule.

Regardless of the outcome of an uncaught third strike, the pitcher is statistically credited with a strikeout, and the batter is statistically charged with one. In an infamous example, Kole Calhoun reached base on Justin Verlander's 3000th career strikeout, and then scored on Andrelton  Simmons's home run immediately thereafter. Because of the uncaught third strike rule, it is possible for a pitcher to register more than three strikeouts in an inning. Numerous pitchers have recorded four strikeouts in an inning in an MLB game, though no five-strikeout innings have ever occurred.

In Little League, in the Tee-Ball and Minor League divisions, the batter is out after the third strike regardless of whether the pitched ball is caught cleanly by the catcher. In Little League (or the Major Division), Junior, Senior, and Big League divisions, a batter may attempt to advance to first base on an uncaught third strike. Little League Major Division Softball and many other youth baseball leagues (such as the USSSA) also follow the rule.

Rule changes
Following a controversial play involving this rule in the ninth inning of Game 2 of the 2005 American League Championship Series, the application of the rule was changed when a comment was added in 2006 to Rule 6.09(b) (After rule numbering changes, Rule 5.09(a)(2) Comment):  

Rule 5.05(a)(2) Comment: A batter who does not realize his situation on a third strike not caught, and who is not in the process of running to first base, shall be declared out once he leaves the dirt circle surrounding home plate.

This comment represents the official interpretation of the application of the rule. Prior to this rule change, a batter was able to try for first at any time before entering the dugout. The new rule would not have affected the controversial play referenced above, as the batter had not left the dirt circle.

References

Baseball rules
Baseball terminology
Catching statistics